Emma Birdsall (born 21 January 1992) is an Australian singer-songwriter from Sydney, New South Wales. She was a participant in the first season of The Voice, and placed in the top 16. Since then she has signed with Island Records Australia under the Universal Music Group, with her debut album set to be released in 2016. Her debut single, titled "Lovers & Friends", was released 16 August 2013. Birdsall has a recurring role in Nine Network's drama Love Child, in which she also features on the soundtrack.

Career 
She came to fame in 2012 as a finalist in Team Seal of The Voice Australia.

Performances 

Following The Voice, Birdsall released "Lovers & Friends" and several songs in the following years through the soundtrack of Channel 9's hit drama Love Child (TV series). She has also spent time doing stage shows internationally (Barbie in 'Barbie...I Can Be', Indonesia) and locally (playing Miriam Aarons in 'The Women', Edgewise Productions for Sydney Fringe Festival). Birdsall is also a talented songwriter, having penned songs for Australian artists Jessica Mauboy, Dami Im, Taylor Henderson and Nathaniel.

Discography

Extended plays

Singles

References 

1992 births
Living people
Australian women singer-songwriters
Singers from Sydney
21st-century Australian singers
21st-century Australian women singers